Cliniodes is a genus of moths of the family Crambidae described by Achille Guenée in 1854.

Species
subgenus Procliniodes Hayden, 2011
Cliniodes costimacula (Hampson, 1913)
Cliniodes insignialis Hayden, 2011
Cliniodes mellalis Hayden, 2011
subgenus Metrea Grote, 1882
Cliniodes beckeralis Hayden, 2011
Cliniodes glaucescens (Hampson, 1899)
Cliniodes latipennis Munroe, 1964
Cliniodes ostreonalis (Grote, 1882)
Cliniodes rubialalis Dognin, 1897
Cliniodes seriopunctalis Hampson, 1913
subgenus Cliniodes
paradisalis species group
Cliniodes paradisalis (Möschler, 1886)
euphrosinalis species group
Cliniodes euphrosinalis Möschler, 1886
Cliniodes nacrealis Munroe, 1964
Cliniodes paranalis Schaus, 1920
Cliniodes subflavescens Hayden, 2011
Cliniodes underwoodi Druce, 1899
opalalis species group
Cliniodes additalis Hayden, 2011
Cliniodes festivalis Hayden, 2011
Cliniodes ineptalis (Lederer, 1863)
Cliniodes inferalis Hayden, 2011
Cliniodes iopolia Hayden, 2011
Cliniodes malleri Munroe, 1964
Cliniodes opalalis Guenée, 1854
Cliniodes opertalis Hayden, 2011
Cliniodes saburralis Guenée, 1854
Cliniodes semilunalis Möschler, 1890
Cliniodes superbalis Dognin, 1911
Cliniodes vinacea Munroe, 1964
unplaced
Cliniodes muralis Hayden, 2011

Former species
Cliniodes cyllarusalis Druce, 1895
Cliniodes mossalis Dyar, 1914
Cliniodes nomadalis Dyar, 1912
Cliniodes paucilinealis Snellen, 1895

References

Eurrhypini
Crambidae genera
Taxa named by Achille Guenée